The Nigerian Girl Guides Association is the national Guiding organization of Nigeria. It serves 113,726 members (as of 2006). Founded in 1919, the girls-only organization became a full member of the World Association of Girl Guides and Girl Scouts in 1966.

Sections
Girl are divided into various age groupings:
Rainbow 4-6
Brownie 7-10
Guide 10-16
Ranger/young leader 16-18

Adults 18 and over can serve as Leaders.

Promise
The Promise closely mirrors those from other countries, the ones listed below are for the Brownie and Guide levels, it is unknown if the other levels have their own promise.

Brownie Promise
I promise to do my best:
To do my duty to God and my country,
To help other people every day,
especially those at home.

Guide Promise
 
'I promise on my honor that i will do  my best,
To do my duty to God and my country,
To help other people at all times
and to obey the Guide Law.

GS Law
As with the Promise there are also differences in the Law.

Brownie Law
A Brownie is truthful, obedient and cheerful.
A Brownie thinks of others before herself.

Guide Law
A guide's honor is to be trusted.
A guide is loyal.
A guide's duty is to be useful and to help others.
A guide is a friend to all and a sister to every other Guide.
A guide is courteous.
A guide is a friend to animals.
A guide obeys orders.
A guide smiles and sings under all difficulties.
A guide is thrifty.
A guide is pure in thought, word and deed.

Motto
Again, following the differences within levels, here are the motto's of the Brownies and Guides.

Brownie Motto: Lend a hand
Guide Motto: Be Prepared

See also
Oyinkansola Abayomi, former head of the Nigerian Girl Guides Association and the first native Nigerian woman to work for the organization
Boy Scouts of Nigeria

References

World Association of Girl Guides and Girl Scouts member organizations
Scouting and Guiding in Nigeria
Youth organizations established in 1919